Nationalist Republican Party may refer to:

 Basque Nationalist Republican Party
 Nationalist Republican Party (Portugal)
 Nationalist Republican Party (Suriname)
 Nationalist Republican Party (Mexico) in the 1920 Mexican general election